The year 1870 in architecture involved some significant architectural events and new buildings.

Buildings and structures

Buildings

 January 6 – The Musikverein in Vienna, designed by Theophil Hansen, is inaugurated.
 May 1 – Equitable Life Building (New York City), designed by Arthur Gilman and Edward H. Kendall, with George B. Post as a consulting engineer, is completed. The 7-storey building is the first office block to incorporate passenger elevators, hydraulic examples by the Elisha Otis company.
 June 23 – Keble College, Oxford, designed by William Butterfield, is opened.
 August 9 – Melbourne Town Hall, Melbourne, Australia is opened.
 November – University of Glasgow new campus building, designed by George Gilbert Scott, is opened.
 Perth Town Hall in Australia, designed by Richard Roach Jewell and James Manning, is completed.
 David Sassoon Library in Bombay, designed by J. Campbell and G. E. Gosling, is completed.
 Khotan Mosque in China is built.
 Approximate date – Les Halles markets in Paris, designed by Victor Baltard, completed.

Awards
 RIBA Royal Gold Medal – Benjamin Ferrey.
 Grand Prix de Rome, architecture: Albert-Félix-Théophile Thomas.

Births
 April 17 – Max Berg, German architect and urban planner (died 1947)
 November 18 – P. Morley Horder, English architect (died 1944)
 December 10 – Adolf Loos, Austrian-Czech Modernist architect (died 1933).
 December 15 – Josef Hoffmann, Austrian architect and designer (died 1965)

Deaths
 January 2 – Ignatius Bonomi, English architect and surveyor (born 1787)
 February 15 – William Burn, pioneer of the Scottish Baronial style (born 1789)
 March 24 – Ferdinand Stadler, Swiss architect (born 1813)
 c. May – John Skipton Mulvany, Irish architect (born 1813)
 October 8 – Félix Duban, French architect (born 1798)
 December 28 – Philip Hardwick, English architect particularly associated with railway stations and warehouses in London (born 1792)

References

Architecture
Years in architecture
19th-century architecture